Lev Yashin Club is an unofficial list of Soviet and Russian football goalkeepers that have achieved 100 or more clean sheets during their professional career. This club is named after the first Soviet goalkeeper to achieve 100 clean sheets: Lev Yashin. The list was created and maintained by journalist and statistician Konstantin Yesenin.

Which clean sheets are counted 
Traditionally, Yesenin counted goals and clean sheets in the following matches:

 Championship - goals scored in top leagues of Soviet and Russian football competitions.
 Cup - goals in Russian and Soviet Cup and Supercup scored in the stages where top league teams participate.
 European cups - goals scored in European Champion Clubs Cup, UEFA Champions League, UEFA Cup, Cup Winners Cup and Intertoto Cup for both home and foreign clubs. The UEFA Europa League, successor to the UEFA Cup, is currently included in the count.
 National team - goals scored for national and olympic teams in the official matches.

Lev Yashin Club 

Players in bold still active.

References

See also
Grigory Fedotov club
Yevhen Rudakov club
Oleh Blokhin club
Serhiy Rebrov club
Timerlan Huseinov club

Footballers in Russia
Footballers in the Soviet Union
Lists of association football players
Soviet football trophies and awards
Association football player non-biographical articles